Harper House, also known as the Ragan House, is a historic farmhouse located in Trinity Township, near Archdale, Randolph County, North Carolina.  It was built about 1815, and is a two-story, three bay by two bay, Federal period frame dwelling, with a lower two-story, three bay by two bay wing.  It has a hipped roof, rests on a brick foundation, and has flanking exterior end chimneys.

It was added to the National Register of Historic Places in 1979.

References

Houses on the National Register of Historic Places in North Carolina
Federal architecture in North Carolina
Houses completed in 1815
Houses in Randolph County, North Carolina
National Register of Historic Places in Randolph County, North Carolina